Padre Sebastiano is a 1904–1906 painting by John Singer Sargent. It is part of the collection of the Metropolitan Museum of Art.

The painting depicts Father Sebastiano, an Italian priest whom the artist met in Giomein, a village in the Italian Alps. The subject had a serious interest in botany, hence the wild flowers.

The work is on view in the Metropolitan Museum's Gallery 770.

See also
 1906 in art

References

1906 paintings
20th-century portraits
Paintings by John Singer Sargent
Paintings in the collection of the Metropolitan Museum of Art
Portraits of men